Justice Welch  may refer to:

Samuel Earl Welch (1892–1969), associate justice of the Oklahoma Supreme Court
William H. Welch (judge) (1805–1863), chief justice of the Territorial Supreme Court of Minnesota
Elizabeth M. Welch (born 1970), associate justice of the Michigan Supreme Court